Today, Tomorrow, Forever is the second studio album from Corey Paul. Collision Records released the album on December 15, 2015.

Critical reception

Awarding the album three and a half stars for New Release Today, Dwayne Lacy states, "Today, Tomorrow, Forever is a nice soundtrack to go with his testimony and offering of hope." Chris Major, giving the album three and a half stars at The Christian Beat, writes, "While Today, Tomorrow, Forever has its merits, unfortunately, there are a few key details worth addressing...Overall, Today Tomorrow Forever is a mixed bag of well executed hits and close misses."

Track listing

Chart performance

References

2015 albums
Corey Paul albums